Olga Danilović was the defending champion, but chose not to participate.

Beatriz Haddad Maia won the title, defeating Francesca Jones in the final, 6–4, 6–3.

Seeds

Draw

Finals

Top half

Bottom half

References

Main Draw

Elle Spirit Open - Singles
2021 Singles